There have been two baronetcies created for persons with the surname Danvers, one in the Baronetage of England and one in the Baronetage of Great Britain. Both creations are extinct.

The D'Anvers Baronetcy, of Culworth in the County of Northampton, was created in the Baronetage of England on 21 March 1643 for Samuel D'Anvers. The title became extinct on the death of the fifth Baronet in 1776.

The Danvers Baronetcy, of Swithland in the County of Leicester, was created in the Baronetage of Great Britain on 4 July 1746 for Joseph Danvers, Member of Parliament for Boroughbridge, Bramber and Totnes. The title became extinct on the death of the second Baronet in 1796.

Danvers baronets, of Culworth (1643)
Sir Samuel Danvers, 1st Baronet (1611–1682)
Sir Pope Danvers, 2nd Baronet (1644–1712)
Sir John Danvers, 3rd Baronet (1673–1744)
Sir Henry D'Anvers, 4th Baronet (1731–1753)
Sir Michael D'Anvers, 5th Baronet (1738–1776)

Danvers baronets, of Swithland (1746)
Sir Joseph Danvers, 1st Baronet (1686–1753)
Sir John Danvers, 2nd Baronet (–1796)

References

Extinct baronetcies in the Baronetage of England
Extinct baronetcies in the Baronetage of Great Britain